Chloé Coulloud is a French actress, known for her role in the 2011 French horror movie Livide.

Filmography

References

External links

1987 births
Living people
French film actresses
21st-century French actresses